Pedro Gibrán Guevara Rocha (born 7 June 1989) is a Mexican professional boxer. He is a former WBC light flyweight champion. In May 2017, he was ranked as the world's best light flyweight by The Ring magazine and the Transnational Boxing Rankings Board, and second by BoxRec.

Career 
Guevara started boxing as a teenager at the UAS. He still trains there, under coaches Marcos and Radamés Hernández. He represented Sinaloa in national Mexican competitions, and claims a victory over Oscar Valdez as an amateur.

Guevara turned pro in March 2008, defeating Gabriel López with a round 2 TKO. Guevara defeated Karluis Diaz on his 14th professional bout, claiming the WBC Silver light flyweight title. Guevara drew with Mario Rodríguez on his next fight. He went on to claim the NABF title, defeating Jorle Estrada with a round 7 TKO.

In August 2012, Guevara challenged for a world title for the first time, facing IBF light flyweight champion John Riel Casimero on his native Mazatlán.  A left hook from Casimero dropped Guevara early on in the first round, but Guevara rallied and took many of the subsequent rounds. Casimero took the last rounds through his superior defense. Casimero got a split decision win (116-111, 114–113, 113–114) to retain his title.

Guevara regained the WBC Silver title on his next fight, beating Raúl García by split decision. Guevara beat Mario Rodríguez, who he'd previously fought to a draw, with a shutout unanimous decision (120-108, 119–109, 118–110).

Guevara vs. Yaegashi 
In December 2014, Guevara fought Akira Yaegashi for the vacant WBC light flyweight title in Tokyo. This was Guevara's first fight outside Mexico. The title was left vacant by Naoya Inoue, who moved up in weight. Yaegashi was moving down in weight, having lost his flyweight titles to Román González. The fight started with both boxers measuring each other, although Guevara seemed to edge the early rounds. Yaegashi started successfully trading shots in round 5. However, Guevara systematically broke Yaegashi down, who went down in round 7 after a left hook to the body. Yaegashi was unable to get up, giving Guevara the win and the WBC title.

Guevara vs. Claveras 
Guevara won his first defense comfortably, stopping outmatched Richard Claveras in one round.

Guevara vs. Lopez 
In July 2015, Guevara defended his title against mandatory challenger Ganigan López. The fight started as a slow, tactical affair, but Guevara pulled ahead with superior skills and more consistent work. López rallied in the championship rounds. Guevara hit the canvas in round 11 but it was ruled a slip. López's rally proved to not be enough as Guevara retained his title with a unanimous decision win (117-111, 116–112, 116–112).

Guevara vs. Kimura 
In November 2015, Guevara's title reign came to a screeching halt, as Guevara dropped a split decision (113-115, 113–115, 117–111) to Yu Kimura. Guevara built an early lead, but he slowed down as the rounds went on due to Kimura's body shots.

Guevara vs. Shiro 
Guevara pushed for a rematch against Kimura and a rematch against Ganigan López, who would unseat Kimura on 2016, but he wouldn't get another title shot until October 2017 against Ken Shiro, who had defeated López earlier that year. Guevara started strongly but as the fight went on, he once again started to slow down due to body shots, with Shiro rallying in the second half of the fight and winning a narrow majority decision (115-113, 115–113, 114-114). After the fight, Shiro called out Ganigan López.

Guevara vs. Teraji 
On 22 October 2017, Kenshiro Teraji beat Pedro Guevara by majority decision in their 12 round contest for the WBC championship of the world. The scorecards were announced as 115-113, 114-114, 116-112 in favor of Teraji.

Personal life
Pedro's brother, Alberto Guevara, is also a boxer who has previously challenged for a world title at bantamweight.

Professional boxing record

See also
List of world light-flyweight boxing champions
List of Mexican boxing world champions

References

External links

Pedro Guevara - Profile, News Archive & Current Rankings at Box.Live

 

|-

|-

1989 births
Living people
Mexican male boxers
Boxers from Sinaloa
Sportspeople from Mazatlán
Light-flyweight boxers
World light-flyweight boxing champions
World Boxing Council champions